Loving U is the first summer special album by South Korean girl group Sistar. It was released on June 28, 2012 by Starship Entertainment and distributed by LOEN Entertainment, with the song of the same title used as the promotional song. It is listed as a summer special album and contains two new songs, "Loving U" and "Holiday", and five remixes of the group's past hit-singles.

Background 
On June 11, Starship Entertainment announced that the group will be releasing a summer special album by the end of June. On June 16, it was stated that the group was spotted in Hawaii recording a music video. On June 28, the extended play and music video were released simultaneously.

Composition 
The extended play is composed of seven tracks: two new songs and five remixes of the group's previously title tracks. "Loving U" and "Holiday" were both written and produced by Duble Sidekick. "Loving U" is the lead song, which makes attractions by the strong beats and fresh lyrics. "Holiday" is the second single of the album. It is close to electronic synthpop. The songs "Push Push" and "So Cool" were remixed by DJ Robato. "Alone" and "Ma Boy" were remixed by Smells. "How Dare You" was remixed by Demicat.

Music video 
A teaser of the music video for "Loving U" was released on June 25, on Starship Entertainment's YouTube account. The full music video was released on June 28, along with the EP, simultaneously. It was also revealed that the music video costed about 200 million won ($169,000 USD) and was recorded in Hawaii.

Promotions 
The first performance of the song "Loving U" was on the 2012 Mnet 20's Choice Awards, realized on June 28, 2012. The TV promotions started on June 29, on KBS' Music Bank. The group received their seventh and eight music show award  on the same music program respectively.  The song will be also promoted on the shows Music Core, Inkigayo and M! Countdown with some performances having an intro mash-up of the albums remixes for "Alone", "How Dare You" and "So Cool".
The group released on July 24 the second single "Holiday".

Track listing

Chart performance

Album chart

Single chart

Sales and certifications

Release history

References

External links 
 

2012 EPs
Korean-language EPs
Sistar EPs
Starship Entertainment EPs